Mutations of proteins that hold the cells of the skin together can cause disease.  Autoantibodies against proteins that hold the cells of the skin together can also cause disease.

See also 
 List of keratins expressed in the human integumentary system
 List of target antigens in pemphigus
 List of immunofluorescence findings for autoimmune bullous conditions
 List of cutaneous conditions
 List of genes mutated in cutaneous conditions
 List of histologic stains that aid in diagnosis of cutaneous conditions
 Keratoderma

References 

 
 

Junctional proteins
Dermatology-related lists